Louisa Chafee (born September 24, 1991) is an American competitive sailor. She represented the United States at the 2016 Summer Olympics in Rio de Janeiro in the mixed Nacra 17, where she finished 8th overall. She is the daughter of former Rhode Island governor and senator Lincoln Chafee.

References

External links

1991 births
Living people
American female sailors (sport)
Olympic sailors of the United States
Sailors at the 2016 Summer Olympics – Nacra 17
Chafee family